Hillpark is a district in the Scottish city of Glasgow. It is situated south of the River Clyde.

Hillpark Secondary School is located within the neighbourhood, which is surrounded by other mainly residential areas such as Auldhouse, Mansewood, Newlands and Pollokshaws.

References

Areas of Glasgow